The Vanderbilt Commodores college football team represents Vanderbilt University in the East Division of the Southeastern Conference (SEC). The Commodores compete as part of the National Collegiate Athletic Association (NCAA) Division I Football Bowl Subdivision. The program has had 28 head coaches since it began play during the 1890 season.

The team has played 1,250 games over 126 seasons of Vanderbilt football. In that time, six coaches have led the Commodores to postseason bowl games: Art Guepe, Steve Sloan, George MacIntyre, Bobby Johnson, James Franklin and Derek Mason. Four other coaches won conference championships: R. G. Acton, Walter H. Watkins, James R. Henry and Dan McGugin.  Between them, the coaches won eleven Southern Intercollegiate Athletic Association championships; McGugin led the team to an additional two titles as a member of the Southern Conference.

McGugin is the leader in seasons coached and games won, with 198 victories during his 30 years at Vanderbilt. E. H. Alley has the highest winning percentage with 1.000. Robbie Caldwell has the lowest winning percentage with .167. Of the 28 different head coaches who have led the Commodores, McGugin, Ray Morrison, Red Sanders, and Bill Edwards have been inducted into the College Football Hall of Fame in South Bend, Indiana.

The current head coach is Clark Lea, who was hired on December 14, 2020.

Key

Coaches

Notes

References 
General

 
 

Specific

Lists of college football head coaches

Vanderbilt Commodores football coaches